Nectar of Heaven is a novel by E. C. Tubb published in 1981.

Plot summary
Nectar of Heaven is a novel in which Earl Dumarest follows a false trail as he searches to find Earth.

Reception
Dave Langford reviewed Nectar of Heaven for White Dwarf #75, and stated that "again Tubb clears the ground for the next sequel with alarming efficiency: the woman with whom Dumarest's got involved is as usual wasted, and he gives away the vast wealth which would make his quest a damn sight easier."

Reviews
Review by Martyn Taylor (1986) in Paperback Inferno, #59

References

1981 novels